The Rio Champions Cup is an event in the Outback Champions Series for senior tennis players. It was founded in 2009 and is held each year in Rio de Janeiro, Brazil.

Finals results

Recurring sporting events established in 2009
Tennis tournaments in Brazil
Champions Series (senior men's tennis tour)
International sports competitions in Rio de Janeiro (city)